The Soviet Union was established on December 30, 1922 and dissolved on December 26, 1991.

Europe

Asia

Americas

Africa

Oceania

References

 

Foreign relations of the Soviet Union
Soviet Union-related lists